The Archetype pattern separates the logic from implementation; the separation is accomplished by there being two abstract classes, a decorator (for logic) and a delegate (for implementation).  The Factory handles the mapping of decorator and delegate classes and returns the pair associated with a parameter or parameters passed. The interface is the contract between a decorator, a delegate and the calling class creating an Inversion of Responsibility. This example use two branches however you can have 'N' branches as required. The pattern means that one branch from the interface does not have to worry about how another branch operators as long it implements the interface.

Sections 

Decorator
The descendants of the decorator class handle the logic, for example performing a calculation. The descendants of the decorator can then call the descendants of the delegated when or if they wish to pass responsibility for example storage or communication.

Delegate
The descendants of the delegate flow class handle the implementation for call a sub-system, storage, or communication. Different children can use completely different sub-systems storage, or communications than each other.

UML

Java example 
public interface Request {
    public void sendRequest();
}

public class RequestFactory {

    public static Request getRequest(String a, String b){
        DecoratorRequest dcr = null;
        DelegateRequest dlr = null;
        
        if (a.equals("A")) 
            dcr = new ADecoratorRequest();
        
        if (a.equals("B")) 
            dcr = new BDecoratorRequest();
        
        if (b.equals("Y")) 
            dlr = new YDelegateRequest();
        
        if (b.equals("Z")) 
            dlr = new ZDelegateRequest();    
        
        dcr.setDelegate(dlr);
        return dcr;            
    }
}

public class App {

    public static void main(String[] args) {
        Request cr = null;

        cr = RequestFactory.getRequest("A", "Y");
        cr.sendRequest();

        cr = RequestFactory.getRequest("A", "Z");
        cr.sendRequest();

        cr = RequestFactory.getRequest("B", "Y");
        cr.sendRequest();

        cr = RequestFactory.getRequest("B", "Z");
        cr.sendRequest();
    }
}

public abstract class DecoratorRequest implements Request {
    protected DelegateRequest delegate;
    
    public DecoratorRequest() {
    }
    
    public void setDelegate(DelegateRequest delegate) {
        this.delegate = delegate;
    }
}

public abstract class DelegateRequest implements Request {

    public DelegateRequest () {
    }
}

public class ADecoratorRequest extends DecoratorRequest {

    @Override
    public void sendRequest() {
        System.out.print("A-");
        delegate.sendRequest();
    }
}

public class BDecoratorRequest extends DecoratorRequest {

    @Override
    public void sendRequest() {
        System.out.print("B-");
        delegate.sendRequest();
    }
}

public class YDelegateRequest extends DelegateRequest {

    @Override
    public void sendRequest() {
        System.out.println("-Y");
    }
}

public class ZDelegateRequest extends DelegateRequest {

    @Override
    public void sendRequest() {
        System.out.println("-Z");
    }
}

Participants 

Delegation pattern - calls the specific implementation

Decorator pattern - performs the generalised logic

Factory method pattern - creates the archetype combination

References

See also
 Design pattern (computer science), a standard solution to common problems in software design
 Behavioral pattern, patterns that identify common communication between objects
 Data mediation
Architecture Patterns ( EA Reference Architecture)

Software design patterns
Articles with example Java code